"Something Just Like This" is a song by American electronic music duo The Chainsmokers and British rock band Coldplay. It was released on February 22, 2017, as the second single from The Chainsmokers debut album, Memories...Do Not Open,  and as the lead single from Coldplay's Kaleidoscope EP. The song samples The Chainsmokers' 2015 hit single "Roses" featuring American songwriter Rozes.

The single reached the top ten of many charts around the world, including number 2 in the UK Singles Chart and the Australian ARIA chart, and number 3 on the US Billboard Hot 100. It was nominated for the Grammy Award for Best Pop Duo/Group Performance at the 60th Annual Grammy Awards; and named one of the best songs of the year by Uproxx and 3voor12.

Background
In September 2016, the Chainsmokers shared three short clips of an upcoming song featuring vocals from Chris Martin. On February 22, 2017, Spotify prematurely posted a banner ad at the top of the site's home page with a Listen Now button.

On February 22, 2017, Coldplay premiered "Something Just Like This" with the Chainsmokers on stage at the Brit Awards at The O2 Arena in London, England. They then performed the song at the 2017 iHeartRadio Music Awards at The Forum in Inglewood, California on March 5, 2017, and on their A Head Full of Dreams Tour since the Singapore show on March 31, 2017. It was performed again at the One Love Manchester benefit concert for the victims of the Manchester Arena bombing on June 4, 2017.

Lyric video
A lyric video was also released on February 22, 2017, on the Chainsmokers' Vevo channel. It has received over 2.1 billion views and is one of the 70 most viewed videos on YouTube. It was directed by James Zwadlo.

Composition
The song is written in the key of D major and has a tempo of 103.156 beats per minute in common time. It follows a chord progression of G–A–Bm–A, and the vocals span two octaves, from G2 to G4.

Chart performance
"Something Just Like This" debuted at number 56 on the Billboard Hot 100 and soared to number five on its second week, becoming the Chainsmokers' third top five after "Don't Let Me Down" and "Closer". Meanwhile, it was Coldplay's second top five hit after "Viva la Vida", peaking at number three on the Billboard Hot 100 ever since. The song was also the sixth best-selling track of 2017 in the United States, with 1,348,000 copies sold. In the United Kingdom, "Something Just Like This" debuted at number 30 on 24 February 2017, reaching its number two peak position the following week, behind Ed Sheeran's "Shape of You". It spent nine consecutive weeks in the top 10 and became the ninth biggest song of the year in the country. The song also set a new record for most weeks atop Billboard's Hot Dance/Electronic Songs chart (79).

Track listing

Credits and personnel
The Chainsmokers
Andrew Taggart – keyboards
Alex Pall – keyboards

Coldplay
Guy Berryman – bass guitar
Jonny Buckland – lead guitar
Will Champion – drums, backing vocals, programming
Chris Martin – lead vocals, piano

Production
The Chainsmokers – production
DJ Swivel – production

Charts

Weekly charts

Year-end charts

Decade-end charts

Certifications

Release history

Covers
In 2018, The Piano Guys released a mashup on piano and cello called Something Just Like Liszt, combining Something Just Like This with Franz Liszt's Hungarian Rhapsody No. 2.

See also
 List of best-selling singles in Australia
List of Billboard Adult Contemporary number ones of 2017

References

2017 singles
2017 songs
The Chainsmokers songs
Coldplay songs
Songs written by Will Champion
Songs written by Chris Martin
Songs written by Guy Berryman
Songs written by Jonny Buckland
Ultratop 50 Singles (Flanders) number-one singles
Number-one singles in Malaysia
Number-one singles in Poland
Songs written by Andrew Taggart
Disruptor Records singles
Songs about superheroes